Steve Young is a television writer for Late Show with David Letterman and Late Night with David Letterman. He is a Harvard University graduate and former writer for the Harvard Lampoon. He also wrote The Simpsons season eight episode "Hurricane Neddy". Young adapted the holiday book Olive, the Other Reindeer for the animated holiday special. He won an Annie Award in 2000 for his screenplay. Young's other television writing credits include Not Necessarily the News.

Young is the co-author, along with Mike "Sport: Murphy, of Everything's Coming Up Profits – The Golden Age of Industrial Musicals, an illustrated history of musicals written for company conventions and sales meetings, told through the rare souvenir record albums.

Young stars in the 2018 documentary Bathtubs Over Broadway detailing his discovery and pursuit of Industrial Musicals.

During the 2007–2008 Writers Guild of America strike Young, along with fellow Late Show writers Eric Stangel, Justin Stangel, Bill Scheft, Matt Roberts, Tom Ruprecht, Jeremy Weiner, Lee Ellenberg, Joe Grossman and Bob Borden posted their "thoughts and observations".

References

External links

American television writers
American male television writers
Annie Award winners
The Harvard Lampoon alumni
Living people
Place of birth missing (living people)
Year of birth missing (living people)